Oihane Hernández Zurbano (born 4 May 2000) is a Spanish professional footballer who plays as a right back for Liga F club Athletic Club and the Spain women's national team.

Club career
Uriarte started her career in Betiko Neskak's academy. In 2020, she signed a new contract running until 2023.

References

External links
 
 
 
 

2000 births
Living people
Women's association football defenders
Spanish women's footballers
Athletic Club Femenino players
Primera División (women) players
Segunda Federación (women) players
People from Mungialdea
Footballers from the Basque Country (autonomous community)
Sportspeople from Biscay
Athletic Club Femenino B players
Spain women's international footballers
Spain women's youth international footballers
21st-century Spanish women